The 2019 Americas Challenge is a curling challenge that took place from November 28 to 30 at Curl Mesabi in Eveleth, Minnesota. This challenge determined the second team from the Americas Zone to qualify for the 2020 World Men's Championship and the 2020 World Women's Championship. It was held as part of the 2019 Curl Mesabi Classic World Curling Tour event.

The United States won both the men's and women's events, with Mexico having a successful debut, finishing second in both events. The men's US team, skipped by Rich Ruohonen went on to the finals of the Curl Mesabi Classic where they lost to a fellow American rink skipped by Korey Dropkin. The women's US team went on to the semifinals of the Curl Mesabi Classic, losing to Canada's Laura Walker rink.

Background
The World Curling Federation allots two men's and two women's spots  for the Americas Zone at the World Curling Championships. For the 2020 Championships Canada has automatically claimed the first slot for both men's, due to having the best final ranking of the Zone in the 2019 Championship, and women's, due to being the host country. If Canada was not hosting the Women's Championship the United States would have received the automatic berth due to finishing one spot higher in the 2019 Championship.

Mexico and Brazil challenged the United States, who would have otherwise qualified automatically due to their finish at the 2019 Championships, for the second Americas Zone slot for both men and women at the 2020 Championships. This was the seventh men's challenge and second women's challenge to be held, but the first men's and women's challenges to include Mexico. The winning team earned the second Americas Zone slot at the World Championships and the runner-up earned the one Americas Zone slot at the 2020 World Qualification Event, giving them another attempt to qualify for the Championships.

Men

Teams

Standings
Final Standings

Results
All draw times are listed in Central Standard Time (UTC−06:00).

Draw 1
Thursday, November 28, 14:30

Draw 2
Thursday, November 28, 19:30

Draw 3
Friday, November 29, 09:00

Draw 4
Friday, November 29, 14:00

Draw 5
Friday, November 29, 19:00

Draw 6
Saturday, November 30, 10:00

Women

Teams

Standings
Final Standings

Results
All draw times are listed in Central Standard Time (UTC−06:00).

Draw 1
Thursday, November 28, 14:30

Draw 2
Thursday, November 28, 19:30

Draw 3
Friday, November 29, 09:00

Draw 4
Friday, November 29, 14:00

Draw 5
Friday, November 29, 19:00

Draw 6
Saturday, November 30, 10:00

References

Americas Challenge
Curling in Minnesota
Americas Challenge
Sports competitions in Minnesota
Americas Challenge
International curling competitions hosted by the United States
Americas Challenge
Events in St. Louis County, Minnesota